Love to the End is a 2018 South Korean television series starring Lee Young-ah, Hong Soo-ah, Kang Eun-tak, and Shim Ji-ho. The series aired on KBS2 from Monday to Friday from 7:50 p.m. to 8:30 p.m. (KST) starting July 23, 2018.

Cast

Main
 Lee Young-ah as Han Ga-young
 Hong Soo-ah as Kang Se-na
 Kang Eun-tak as Yoon Jung-han
 Shim Ji-ho as Kang Hyun-ki
 Jung Hye-in as Emily
 Han Ki-woong as Park Jae-dong
 Lee Kyung-jin as Lee Jung-in

Ratings 
In this table,  represent the lowest ratings and  represent the highest ratings.
NR denotes that the drama did not rank in the top 20 daily programs on that date.
N/A denotes that the rating is not known.

Awards and nominations

Notes

References

External links
  
 

Korean Broadcasting System television dramas
2018 South Korean television series debuts
2018 South Korean television series endings
Korean-language television shows